This is a list of communities on the Navajo Nation, including the checkerboard, arranged alphabetically. 

Alamo, New Mexico
Aneth, Utah
Baca, New Mexico
Beclabito, New Mexico 
Becenti, New Mexico
Bitter Springs, Arizona
Borrego Pass, New Mexico
Brimhall Nizhoni, New Mexico
Burnside, Arizona
Burnt Water, Arizona
Cameron, Arizona
Casamero Lake, New Mexico
Cheechilgetto, New Mexico
Chilchinbito, Arizona
Chinle, Arizona
Church Rock, New Mexico
Counselor, New Mexico
Coyote Canyon, New Mexico
Crownpoint, New Mexico
Crystal, New Mexico
Coalmine Canyon, Arizona
Dennehotso, Arizona
Dilkon, Arizona
Fort Defiance, Arizona
Ganado, Arizona
Greasewood, Arizona
Halchita, Utah
Hospah, New Mexico
Houck, Arizona
Huerfano, New Mexico
Hunters Point, Arizona
Indian Wells, Arizona
Iyanbito, New Mexico
Jeddito, Arizona
Kaibito, Arizona
Kayenta, Arizona
Kinlichee, Arizona
Klagetoh, Arizona
Lake Valley, San Juan County, New Mexico
Lechee, Arizona
Leupp, Arizona
Littlewater, New Mexico
Lukachukai, Arizona
Many Farms, Arizona
Mariano Lake, New Mexico
Montezuma Creek, Utah
Nageezi, New Mexico
Nakaibito, New Mexico
Naschitti, New Mexico
Navajo, New Mexico
Navajo Mountain, Utah
Nazlini, Arizona
Nenahnezad, New Mexico
Newcomb, New Mexico
Oak Springs, Arizona
Ojo Amarillo, New Mexico
Ojo Encino, New Mexico
Oljato-Monument Valley, Arizona
Oljato–Monument Valley, Utah
Pinon, Arizona
Pinedale, New Mexico
Pine Springs, Arizona
Prewitt, New Mexico
Pueblo Pintado, New Mexico
Ramah Navajo Indian Reservation, Ramah, New Mexico
Red Lake, Arizona
Red Mesa, Arizona
Rock Point, Arizona
Rough Rock, Arizona
Round Rock, Arizona
Sanostee, New Mexico
Sawmill, Arizona
Sheep Springs, New Mexico
Shiprock, New Mexico
Shonto, Arizona
Smith Lake, New Mexico
Smoke Signal, Arizona
St. Michaels, Arizona
Standing Rock, New Mexico
Steamboat, Arizona
Sunrise, Arizona
Teec Nos Pos, Arizona
Thoreau, New Mexico
To'Hajiilee, New Mexico
Tohatchi, New Mexico
Tonalea, Arizona
Tsaile, Arizona
Tse Bonito, New Mexico
Tselakai Dezza, Utah
Tuba City, Arizona
Twin Lakes, New Mexico
Tolani Lake, Arizona
Upper Fruitland, New Mexico
White Horse Lake, New Mexico
White Rock, San Juan County, New Mexico
Wide Ruins, Arizona
Window Rock, Arizona
Yah-ta-hey, New Mexico

Notes

References
 Linford, Laurance D. Navajo places: history, legend, landscape. University of Utah Press. Salt Lake City, UT: 2000.

External links

 "Navajo Nation Division of Community Development"
 "Map of Navajo Country" with list of settlements, landmarks, water features, parks and forests, by Harrison Lapahie Jr.

Navajo Nation
List of communities on the Navajo Nation
Nav
Navajo Nation